was a Japanese politician. He served as justice minister for two terms and as finance minister.

Early life and education
Ueki was born in 1900. He received a law degree from Tokyo University in 1925.

Career
Following graduation Ueki began his career at the ministry of finance. During World War II he was the head of budget bureau. In 1945, he became the head of monopoly bureau at the ministry.

He was elected to the house of representatives in 1952. He was a member of the Liberal Democratic Party. At the end of the 1950s he was among the Japanese house members union to promote Japan - China trade. He served as justice minister for two terms. He was first appointed to the post on 8 December 1960, replacing Tetsuzo Kojima. Ueki's term ended on 18 Jul 1962 and was replaced by Kunio Nakagaki as justice minister.

Ueki was appointed president of Sagami Women's University in 1968. He again served as justice minister for a brief period between February to July 1971. On 7 July 1972 he was appointed minister of finance to the cabinet led by Prime Minister Kakuei Tanaka, replacing Mikio Mizuta in the post. At age 72 Ueki was the oldest member of the Tanaka cabinet. His term ended on 22 December 1972 when Kiichi Aichi was appointed to the post.

References

External links

|-

|-

|-

1900 births
1980 deaths
Liberal Democratic Party (Japan) politicians
Members of the House of Representatives (Japan)
Ministers of Finance of Japan
Ministers of Justice of Japan
Presidents of universities and colleges in Japan
University of Tokyo alumni
20th-century Japanese lawyers